Natwarsinhji Cricket Club Ground is cricket ground in Porbandar, Saurashtra. The ground has hosted a Ranji Trophy match in October 1960 between Saurashtra cricket team and Maharashtra cricket team. The match was  Maharashtra cricket team won by 10 wickets as match had a low scores with Saurashtra scored 94 & 139 and Maharashtra scored 187 and 47/0 as scheduled for three days but was completed in two days. This was only cricket was ever played on the ground.

References

External links
 Cricinfo
 Cricketarchive 
 Wikimapia

Cricket grounds in Saurashtra (region)
Porbandar
Defunct cricket grounds in India
Sports venues completed in 1960
1960 establishments in Gujarat
20th-century architecture in India